Mahamahopadhyay Pandit Mahesh Chandra Nyayratna Bhattacharyya  (22 February 1836 – 12 April 1906) was an Indian scholar of Sanskrit, and the principal of the Sanskrit College between 1876 and 1895. A friend and colleague of Ishwar Chandra Vidyasagar, he played an important role in the Bengal Renaissance. He was one of the most eminent Bengalis in Kolkata of the nineteenth century.

Biography

Personal life 
Mahesh Chandra Nyayratna Bhattacharyya, who was one of the most distinguished Sanskrit scholars in India, was born on 22 February 1836 to a Kulin Brahmin family of the highest rank, the Bhattacharyya family of Narit, which has long been distinguished for the zealous cultivation of Sanskrit learning, and the number of learned Pandits it has produced.
His father, Harinarayan Tarkasiddhanta, and his two uncles, Guruprasad Tarkapanchanan and Thakurdas Churamani, were eminent Pandits. His elder brother, Pandit Madhab Chandra Sarbabhauma, was the Sabha Pandit of Mahishadal Raj.

In 1848, he married Mandakini, the daughter of Pandit Ram Chand Tarkabagis, in Jehanabad, Hooghly.

He had a daughter, Manorama, and three sons – Manmatha Nath Vidyaratna Bhattacharyya, MA (first Indian Accountant General of Madras), born April 1863, Munindra Nath Bhattacharyya, MA, BL (Vakil of the High Court of Calcutta), born February 1868 and Mahima Nath Bhattacharyya, BA (first Indian Collector in the Excise Department, Government of India), born April 1870.

He died at the age of 70 on 12 April 1906.

Career in academia
He succeeded Prasanna Kumar Sarbadhikary as the principal of the Sanskrit College in 1876.

During his 19-year tenure as principal he took the initiative of introducing the Sanskrit Title Examination, for the conferment of titles on meritorious students of special departments of Sanskrit learning.

He started a secondary Anglo-Sanskrit school at his native village of Narit, that exists till date as Narit Nyayratna Institution.

Written work
He edited, with copious notes, Kavya Prakas, Mimansa Darshan and the Black Yajur Veda. He wrote numerous pamphlets, such as Remarks on Dayananda Saravati's Veda-Bhashya, Tulasidharan Mimansa, The Authorship of Mrichchhakatika and Lupta Samvatsara.

Swami Dayanand eminent Vedic scholar replied doubts raised by Maheshchandra NyayaRatan by publishing a book name Bhranti Nivarana in 1880.
He achieved notably in the general advancement of Sanskrit learning and also, by financial aid and otherwise, in furtherance of famine relief, the promotion of education and opening out means of communication.

Philanthropy
He not only greatly improved roads and infrastructure in and around Narit, but also took a leading role in developing roads and infrastructure, including tramways, in his native district of Howrah.

Honours and titles
The title of Mahamahopadhyay was conferred as a personal distinction on 16 February 1887, on the occasion of the Jubilee of the reign of Queen Victoria, for eminence in oriental learning. It entitled him to take rank in the Durbar immediately after titular Rajas.

Mahesh Chandra Nyayratna was made a Companion of the Most Eminent Order of the Indian Empire (CIE) on 24 May 1881 and the estimation with which Indian scholars held him is marked by the title of Nyayratna.

He was elected a Foreign Member of the Hungarian Academy of Sciences at Budapest.
He was a member of the Bengal Asiatic Society, the Indian Association for the Cultivation of Science, the University of Calcutta, the Board of Examiners, the Central Text Book Committee of Bengal, the Behar Sanskrit Samaj and the Anthropological Society of Bombay.
He was a Joint-Secretary of the Hindu Hostel Committee, member of the Bethune College Committee and a Visitor at the Government Engineering College at Shibpur, Howrah.

He was also in charge of Sanskrit education of the Bengal presidency, which comprised then, the present West Bengal, Bihar and Orissa states.

Nyayratna Lane in Shyambazar (North Kolkata) is named after him.

Descendants
Many of his descendants have left their mark in the pages of Kolkata's rich history. Foremost among them was his eldest son, Manmatha Nath Vidyaratna Bhattacharyya.

Manmatha Bhattacharyya Street in Shyambazar is named after him, the first Indian Accountant General of Madras. Manmatha Nath was a close friend and confidante of Swami Vivekananda who was based at his palatial establishment in Madras, when he toured South India. Vivekananda kept in touch wit Manmatha Nath on a regular basis and wrote to him regularly from the USA. Manmatha Nath's daughter was worshipped by Vivekananda as the Kumari, during the first ever Kumari Puja in 1901, at the historic Belur Math in Howrah.

Works online

References

External links 

Ramakrishnavivekananda.info
Swami Vivekananda in India: A Corrective Biography by Rajagopal Chattopadhyaya
Commonground.ca
Myth and Mythmaking by Julia Leslie
Frankreport.com/vivekananda/KnownLetters
Complete Works of Swami Vivekananda, Volume 6, Conversations and Dialogues
Reminiscences of Swami Vivekananda by A. Srinivasa Pai

1836 births
1906 deaths
19th-century Indian scholars
20th-century Indian scholars
Indian scholars
Indian academics
Bengali Hindus
20th-century Bengalis
19th-century Bengalis
West Bengal academics
Indian educators
Educationists from India
19th-century educators
Educators from West Bengal
University of Calcutta alumni
Academic staff of the University of Calcutta
Companions of the Order of the Indian Empire
Indian Sanskrit scholars
Sanskrit scholars from Bengal
Scholars from Kolkata
People from Howrah district
Indian writers
Indian male writers
20th-century Indian writers
20th-century Indian male writers
19th-century Indian writers
19th-century Indian male writers
Indian philanthropists
Indian social workers
Social workers from West Bengal
Indian social reformers